Stadionul Michael Klein is a multi-use stadium in Hunedoara, Romania. It is currently used mostly for football matches and is the home ground of CS Hunedoara. The stadium holds 16,500 people. Opened in 1960 the stadium was the home ground of Corvinul Hunedoara for 44 years, until the dissolution of "The Ravens".

The stadium originally known as Corvinul was renamed in the 1990s after Michael Klein, the Romanian international footballer who died on the pitch in 1993, while playing for Bayer Uerdingen.

It is the 16th stadium in the country by capacity.

References

External links
Stadionul Michael Klein. soccerway.com

Football venues in Romania
Buildings and structures in Hunedoara County
Hunedoara